Dudley Francis Cecil Wolfe (February 6, 1896 – July 30, 1939) was an American socialite. As a racing yacht owner and captain, he was the first person to race a sixty-foot yacht across the Atlantic, competing against much larger vessels. He was to inherit a large fortune from his maternal grandfather provided he changed his family name to "Smith", to which he agreed before reverting again. Wolfe became posthumously famous when he died on the 1939 American Karakoram expedition to K2 in controversial circumstances.

Family background
Dudley Wolfe was born in New York on February 6, 1896 to Dudley Wolfe and Mabel Florence Wolfe (née Smith). His father had immigrated from England in 1888 and was a coffee importer. Claiming to have an aristocratic background, Wolfe senior mixed in New York high society telling entirely fictitious stories of his life tiger hunting in India and so forth.

His mother was the daughter of the immensely wealthy Benjamin Franklin Smith, who together with his three brothers had made their money in gold and silver mining in Colorado in the mid-19th century. They wisely sold at the height of the boom to move into real estate and railroads. When they returned to Maine in the 1880s they were thought to be worth $20 to $30 million (roughly $ to $ million in ). Benjamin's three brothers had no children so he was able to pass down the entire estate.

Wolfe's parents had married on October 15, 1892 and within a year his father's business was bankrupt. Despite these circumstances, the family lived a wealthy lifestyle thanks to a steady flow of cash from his mother's family. The couple had four children, three sons and a daughter – Dudley was the middle son. They had lavish educations at a series of boarding schools but none of the boys did well academically at school. Dudley was, however, good at sports – football, hockey, running, boating and hunting. Wolfe senior died in May 1908, and Mabel remarried, to a Nebraska businessman, Joseph Baldridge, and moved to Omaha. Eventually Wolfe's academic progress was so poor that he was not allowed to continue at Phillips Academy even though the headmaster recognized his "faithful, conscientious effort" and the goodwill he had engendered at the school.

Wartime
In 1916, unable to find a satisfactory job, Wolfe tried to join the WWI war effort by applying to join several branches of the U.S. military but he was rejected because of poor eyesight and flat feet. He then put himself on the year-long waiting list for the French Foreign Legion, while in the meantime joining the Red Cross ambulance corps. In 1917 he sailed for Europe. In Liverpool by complete chance he met Lucien Wolf who, for the first time, told him of his father's true background. Lucien Wolf's brother, Dudley Wolf (before he changed his name to Wolfe), had been the son of a Bohemian Jew who escaped antisemitic uprisings in 1848 to become a tobacconist in London. Wolfe's grandmother, Céline Redlich, had come from Vienna. It is not clear whether the Smith side of his family ever knew about Dudley Wolf(e)'s true background.

Wolfe volunteered to work at various war fronts driving an ambulance, a slightly converted Model T Ford, under appalling conditions taking wounded soldiers back from the front to the field hospitals. Later joining the Italian Ambulance Service he was awarded the Italian Croce di Guerra and a campaign medal on the Italian front. After ten months' ambulance service, in October 1918 he was called up into the Foreign Legion but only served for a month up to the armistice – he was awarded the French Volunteer Medal and Campaign Medal. Phillips Academy now acclaimed him as having won more medals than any other alumnus.

Inheritance
Wolfe stayed in Europe for a year before returning to Omaha to take part in running the family real estate business. This was not to his liking so every summer he went to Maine for yacht racing. In 1924 he left Omaha for good and that year he and his brothers were summoned to the vast Maine estate of their 94-year-old grandfather Smith. Grandfather Benjamin Smith's fortune was by then worth $70 to $100 million (roughly $ million to $ billion in ) – reputedly he was the richest man in New England. By strong family tradition his fortune would normally have been inherited by Mabel's brother but he had died long ago after leaving one son, Clifford. Smith so strongly disapproved of Clifford that he announced that his heirs would be his three grandsons from Mabel. The proviso was that the three boys were required to change their family name to Smith and they agreed to do this legally. However, after a while Dudley felt the change of name had been disloyal to his father so he went to his grandfather to say he would change back and decline the inheritance. The elder Smith was impressed with this principled stance and agreed to leave the share of his fortune to him anyway; grandfather Smith died in 1927.

Sporting youth
Wolfe was gentle, cheerful and rather shy. He was very stockily built, strong and very determined. Although he was extremely wealthy he was not ostentatiously so in his manner although he had refined tastes. He owned a large estate on the coast of Maine, likened by his nephew to something from The Great Gatsby, with Rolls–Royces, large power boats and sailing yachts. In 1925 he was accepted by Harvard University despite not having the required academic qualifications – he eventually graduated in 1930. He joined the elite unofficial "Dicey" chapter of Delta Kappa Epsilon and the "Owl Club", easily meeting the requirements of social status and wealth. Despite being ten years older than his colleagues he was popular and respected for his experiences of the war and his yachting successes.

Wolfe raced in a range of international and local yachting competitions. He raced his new yacht to win the Brooklyn Yacht Club's deep-sea Challenge Cup in 1925. In 1929 he commissioned a sixty-foot schooner, calling it Mohawk, and entered the transatlantic "King and Queen's Cup Classic" although no one previously had raced a sixty-foot yacht across the ocean. Captaining the vessel he came in second despite competing against yachts of one hundred feet and over. He also commissioned a racing cutter Highland Light in which he took part in the 1931 Fastnet Race.

Wolfe moved to live in Europe where he participated in climbing and skiing in the Alps, appointing guides to help him. He became an accomplished skier – he achieved a ski traverse across the Mont Blanc massif – but he struggled to master the technicalities of climbing.

Marriage
In 1934 at St Anton in the Austrian Alps, he noticed and asked to be introduced to Alice Blaine Damrosch. Damrosch was the eldest daughter (born May 18, 1892) of Walter Damrosch, the American conductor. She had married Hall Pleasants Pennington in 1914 but deserted him early in the morning on the first day after their wedding. She went on to have many romances but she and her husband remained friends and only divorced in the late 1920s when she moved from the United States to Austria. She spent her life socializing, skiing and hunting, and was the first woman to ski down the ice wall of Tuckerman's Ravine. The couple married in October 1934 and maintained homes in New York, Maine and Austria. By 1938, although still in love with his wife, Wolfe decided he wanted to be a single man again so he asked Damrosch for divorce. She was devastated but they continued living together even after the divorce became final.

K2 expedition

In early 1938, Wolfe and his wife held a party in their Fifth Avenue apartment in Manhattan to show friends photographic slides of their climbing and skiing activities in Europe. Fritz Wiessner, the famous German-American mountain climber, had been invited, and he was on the lookout for wealthy mountaineers who might be willing to join in, and pay for, an expedition he was organising to attempt to climb the second-highest mountain in the world, the  K2. At the time, none of the 14 mountains over 8000 metres had been climbed. When Wiessner broached the subject with him, Wolfe was immediately hooked, despite his inexperience in climbing high mountains.

On December 10, 1938, Wolfe sailed on the Georgic to stay with Alice for Christmas in Austria before leaving for India. Their divorce had become final in November but she had invited him to be with her all the same. In early spring he tried and failed to reach the summits of Mont Blanc and Piz Palu, even with a guide. In March 1939, he met Wiessner in England where they bought climbing equipment to complement the sports clothes he had purchased in New York. The whole team boarded the SS Conte Biancamano in Genoa on March 29, 1939, to sail to Bombay, with Wolfe paying to upgrade all the tickets to first class.

Throughout the expedition Wolfe and Alice wrote each other loving letters. At Srinigar, at the start of the expedition proper, Wolfe was dismayed to find out that Wiessner had not taken his advice to bring two-way radios. On the march in to K2 base camp, Wolfe coped as well as anyone else and started off strongly when it came to climbing the mountain. However, above Camp II he was noticeably slow and was criticised for that by some of his colleagues. Wiessner favoured him over the other team members because he was less complaining and had good endurance. Wolfe did not take any sort of lead, however, and merely plodded up to each camp after it had been established by other climbers. In this way he got further up the mountain than any of the Americans except Wiessner.

He waited there for seven days while Wiessner and Pasang Dawa Lama made their failed summit bid. Then, descending with the others to Camp VII at  Wolfe waited another seven days under appalling conditions while his two companions went down further to get help. As they reached each camp, they found nobody there and any equipment had been removed, so they went on down until they arrived at base camp. On July 29, during one of three attempts at rescue, three Sherpas managed to climb up to Wolfe and might conceivably have rescued him. However, he was in a terrible mental state and refused to go down, asking them to return the next day. After that, the Sherpas themselves also died on the mountain.

In the months and years following, there were strong recriminations over whether Wiessner had abandoned Wolfe or had done his best to rescue him, why the expedition had been an organisational failure, why Wolfe had been allowed to climb so high (and why he had been allowed on the expedition at all), and whether the Sherpas should have been allowed to try and rescue him. Wolfe's brother, Clifford Warren Smith, considered taking legal action, but eventually decided to drop the case.

In 2002, skeletal remains were found on the Godwin-Austen Glacier at the foot of K2. Close by were vintage pieces of mountaineering equipment and a leather mitten marked "Wolfe". By inscribing an ancient dinner plate from amongst the debris with Wolfe's name, a plaque was made for the nearby Gilkey Memorial, which at that time had the names of 52 other climbers who had died on K2.

See also
List of solved missing person cases

Notes

References

Citations

Works cited

Further reading

1896 births
1930s missing person cases
1939 deaths
American mountain climbers
American people of English descent
American people of World War I
Formerly missing people
French military personnel of World War I
Harvard University alumni
Mountaineering deaths on K2
Missing person cases in Pakistan
Phillips Academy alumni
Soldiers of the French Foreign Legion